iCare Foodbank was established on October 16, 2016 by Babajimi Benson of Ikorodu Constituency through his iCare Foundation. It is the first food bank in Nigeria. iCare Foodbank distributes food ingredients monthly to a minimum of three hundred families including  elderly people, widows, indigent people and the vulnerable in the society.

See also

 List of food banks

References

Organizations based in Lagos State
Food banks in Nigeria